Anacopia Fortress is an ancient military citadel in New Athos (as it is currently known) in the disputed Republic of Abkhazia, located some 22 km (14 miles) by road along the coast from Sukhumi. The site, approximately 450 × 150 meters in dimensions, is located a mile or so inland, at the top of the Iverian Mountain. It is the most complete surviving building of ancient Anacopia, the former capital of the Kingdom of Abkhazia.

History
A military structure was constructed here between the second and fourth centuries. At the end of the seventh century walls were constructed around the site of the citadel, with support from the Byzantines who had become alarmed by Islamist expansionism. The walls, up to 60 com (2 feet) thick, are constructed of largely tightly assembled and carefully hewn limestone blocks. There is a single entrance, a small gate on the south side of the enclosure. At the centre is a Roman style tower, four storeys high, with excellent views in all directions across the surrounding landscape and, to the south-west of the fortress, the Black Sea. A small Christian basilica was also constructed in the centre of the fortress during or before the eighth century. The stone altar from it survives (2014), along with some frescoes featuring a cross and some fishes, a religious symbol frequently used by early Christians in and around the Eastern Roman empire. Next to the church is a cistern filled naturally with spring water by means of a 25 meter deep well beneath it. 

During the eighth century Anacopia found itself near the moving frontier that separated Byzantine Christendom from the Umayyad Caliphate, and in 736/737 Abū ʿAbd Al-Malik Marwān ibn Muḥammad, the future Marwan II, appeared outside the walls with a force of 60,000 men and laid siege to what was by now the capital of the Abkhazian Kingdom. The Georgian chronicle relates that the citadel was defended by a force of 1,000 Iberians and 2,000 Abkhazians under the leadership of Leon I of Abkhazia. The chronicle recalls that the Arab forces suffered from an epidemic that killed 35,000 of them while a further 3,000 were killed in the fighting. The successful defence of Anacopia is regarded as a pivotal turning point in the history of the region.   

A restoration was undertaken in 2008 to improve the safety of the site and reinstate the tower as a usable lookout point.

References

Fortifications in Abkhazia
Castles and forts in Georgia (country)
Archaeological sites in Georgia (country)